James Joseph Hackett (October 1, 1877 – March 28, 1961), nicknamed "Sunny Jim", was a Major League Baseball player. He played two seasons in the majors for the St. Louis Cardinals. In , he was primarily a pitcher, appearing in 4 games with an 0–3 record at that position. In , he was primarily a first baseman, batting .228, while still appearing in seven games on the mound and going 1–3.

Sources

1877 births
1961 deaths
Baseball players from Illinois
Bloomington Bloomers players
Burlington Colts players
Dubuque Tigers players
Jacksonville Jacks players
Jacksonville Lunatics players
Major League Baseball first basemen
Major League Baseball pitchers
Mansfield Haymakers players
Nashville Vols players
Oakland Oaks (baseball) players
Ottumwa Giants players
Sportspeople from Jacksonville, Illinois
Quincy Little Giants players
St. Louis Cardinals players
Terre Haute Hottentots players
Marion Oilworkers players